The Al-Sadaqua Walsalam Stadium is a multi-purpose stadium in Adiliya Kuwait City, Kuwait.  It is currently used mostly for football matches.  The stadium holds 21,500. It is the 2nd largest stadium in Kuwait. The Stadium hosted many finals for the Kuwait Emir Cup and Kuwait Crown Cup. In addition, 2 Arabian Gulf Cup Tournaments were held in this Stadium, the first taking place in 1990 where Kuwait won the 10th Arabian Gulf Cup trophy, and the second in 2003, where they finished 6th.

This stadium is the home ground for Kazma.

Naming
Its name means "Friendship and Peace", a name it earned when it was host to a football match between Iraq and Iran after the end of the first Gulf War for the 1989 Peace and Friendship Cup.

Greece 
Greece also has a stadium called Peace and Friendship Stadium (Στάδιο Ειρήνης και Φιλίας) in Piraeus.

External links
Stadium information

References

Football venues in Kuwait
Multi-purpose stadiums in Kuwait